In the United States, a water boy or water girl (sometimes spelled waterboy or watergirl) was someone who worked in the field, providing water to farm workers in the 19th and early 20th centuries. Today, the name is given to those who work on the sidelines at sports events to provide water for athletes. The phrase has also been used to describe diminutive figures who serve another team or person in the business and political worlds, in a slightly derogatory manner (ex. "Bill is the CEO's water boy").

The position has a long history in athletics. In the 1869 New Jersey vs. Rutgers football game, one of the earliest American football games, an unnamed water boy is documented giving aid to a Rutgers player.

Among notable people who served as water boys is President Herbert Hoover, who was the Stanford Cardinal football's first water boy.

History
Although the term in modern American usage is now associated with sports, traditionally a water boy was a boy employed in farming or industry to provide water for farm workers or machinery. On cotton plantations, just as in modern manual harvesting or picking, the water carrier was in constant demand. This is documented in the folk song Waterboy "Water boy, where are you hidin'?" which is only the best known of many folk and plantation water-call songs.

Early agricultural machinery also needed a water boy to supply water for cooling. The introduction of steam threshing engines required large amounts of water to produce steam, and steam threshing engine teams would employ water boys to go from farm to farm with the engine team. This probably was behind the name "boy" on Waterloo Boy tractors from 1896, later products of Deere and Company, as Waterloo Gasoline engines had recently introduced water pumps to replace the traditional farm water boy.

The railroads also employed water boys.

In India the water boy, pani-wallah or bhisti, was an occupation. The title character in Gunga Din (poem 1892, film 1939) is a water boy.

See also
Batboy in baseball
The Waterboy, Adam Sandler film

References

Sports occupations and roles
Agricultural occupations
Railway occupations
Boy